Damian Mol (born 26 May 1998) is a Dutch professional darts player who competes in Professional Darts Corporation events.

At Q-School in 2022, Mol won his Tour Card on by finishing seventh on the European Q-School Order of Merit, to get himself a two-year card on the PDC circuit.

Performance timeline 

PDC European Tour

References

External links

1998 births
Living people
Professional Darts Corporation current tour card holders
Dutch darts players